Aftabodeen Shamshudeen (born 9 July 1977) is a Guyanese-born cricketer who has played one One Day International for Canada.

External links 

1977 births
Living people
Canada One Day International cricketers
Canadian cricketers
Canadian people of Indian descent
People from New Amsterdam, Guyana
Guyanese emigrants to Canada
Guyanese people of Indian descent
Guyanese cricketers